Admiral Woodhouse may refer to:

Charles Woodhouse (1893–1978), British Royal Navy admiral
Hector Mackenzie Woodhouse (1889–1971), British Royal Navy rear admiral
William Woodhouse (naval officer) (by 1517–1564), English Navy lieutenant admiral